The Bayer designation Lambda Tucanae (λ Tuc, λ Tucanae) is shared by two star systems in the constellation Tucana.

 λ1 Tucanae
 λ2 Tucanae

They are separated by 0.23° in the sky.

Tucanae, Lambda
Tucana (constellation)